Thunderbox may refer to:

Thunderbox, a slang word for a portable toilet
Thunderbox (album), by the group Humble Pie
Thunderbox Gold Mine, a disused gold mine in Leinster, Western Australia
Thunderbox Heavyweight Tournament, a former boxing tournament in Atlantic City, New Jersey
Donnerbüchse, rolling stock formerly used on German railways